Alexander Nilsson may refer to:

Alexander Nilsson (footballer, born 1990), Swedish footballer
Alexander Nilsson (footballer, born 1992), Swedish footballer
Alexander Nilsson (footballer, born 1997), Swedish footballer